A litblog (alternate: lit-blog or literary blog)  is a blog that focuses primarily on the topic of literature. There is a community of litblogs in the blogosphere whose authors cover a variety of literary topics. An author of a litblog is called a 'Litblogger' and they write about fiction, nonfiction, poetry, the publishing industry, literary journals, literary criticism, and more.  They may focus on special genres of literature, including science fiction and mystery.  Some litbloggers prefer an objective or formal tone, while others are more conversational.

Many litblogs feature reviews of books which may or may not be featured in the mainstream press. Some litblogs feature critiques of reviews in the mainstream press.  Interviews with authors are another common feature. Litblogs can also be used as virtual reading groups for focused discussion on a specific piece or pieces of literature, with some litblogs following a particular piece of literature through an entire reading, and others reprinting diaries or letters from authors.  Some litblogs are resources for information about the publishing industry, publicity, or writing craft.

Many litblogs have one author, but collaborative blogs have many authors, one of whom may serve as the primary author overseeing contributors.  There are also collaborative blogs focussing on significant international or national literary awards such as Read the Nobels and The Complete Booker where contributors share reviews of winning and shortlisted titles, information about award-winning authors or the history of the award. These are sometimes associated with so-called 'reading challenges' but they can become a useful repository of commentary about award winners and their books over time, especially in the case of less well-known authors. 
Other collaborative blogs include those focusing on the work of a single notable author such as La Comedie Humaine where members share their summaries and reviews as well as information about the French author, Honoré de Balzac.

Examples 
Bookslut, Laila Lalami, The Literary Saloon, and Maud Newton are some of the oldest well-known active literary blogs. Moby Lives, one of the oldest literary blogs, was recently defunct, but has returned on the Melville House Publishing website.  Litkicks, run by Levi Asher is the oldest-known literary blog of its kind and also remains active. 

See also: HTML Giant, Reader of Depressing Books, No One Does That, and The Rumpus. Abandoned Books reviews books and authors not much discussed on the web any more but which were bestsellers in their day. The blog's owner, Doug Bassett, is interested in bestsellers of the past, "partly because there seems to be a real dearth of information on these authors, partly because I'm interested in what books become popular, what these authors share (or don't share)."

Bilingual literary bloggers include Book Around the Corner (France, written in English), Iris on Books (Holland, in English), Beauty is a Sleeping Cat (Switzerland, in English), Caravana de Recuerdos (bilingual Spanish/English).
Some litblogs are profitable businesses while others are not run for profit. Some authors of litblogs are professional writers, academics, literature enthusiasts or industry professionals. Others are simply people who enjoy writing about books.  In the democratic forum of the blogosphere, these groups can interact by reading and commenting on one another's posts.  

Increasingly newspapers and magazines are also creating litblogs.  Dwight Garner of the New York Times Book Review writes a litblog called Paper Cuts that is hosted by the newspaper. The Guardian allows authors to chime in on books and current publishing gossip at a feature called Comment is free. Litblogs can also serve as adjuncts to literary journals or organizations, such as those of 3:AM Magazine, Inside Higher Ed, Spike Magazine, The Virginia Quarterly Review, and the Poetry Foundation. The National Book Critics Circle has its own litblog called Critical Mass that posts commentary that is very critical of nonprofessional litbloggers.

LitBloggers have also entered the Literary Prize scene by hosting what are called Shadow Literary Prizes, which have no monetary value but offer valuable international publicity to the long and short-listed books, and provide an archive of reviews of the titles, since all the longlisted titles are reviewed by at least one member of the Shadow Jury, and all the shortlisted titles are reviewed by all members.  The Shadow Giller Prize, founded in 1995, was the first of these Shadow Literary Prizes.  Its origins were the inaugural Shadow Giller Lunch of literary critics and people in the publishing industry in 1995, but the concept migrated to the web in 2009.  Coordinated by Kevin From Canada,  who convenes a 'jury' each year, the Shadow Giller Prize Jury by consensus awards its own Shadow Prize to the book the jury prefers . In 2011, The Shadow Man Asian Literary Prize began : modelled on the Shadow Giller and coordinated by ANZ LitLovers in Australia , it also has an international jury of bloggers who commit to the same principle: to criticize a prize, a Shadow Literary Prize Jury makes its choice before the Real Jury makes its announcement.

Professional 
Professional critics have litblogs at House of Mirth, About Last Night, Inside Higher Ed, The Dizzies, and more. In addition, the litbloggers from The Elegant Variation, Laila Lalami, The Old Hag, Maud Newton, Return of the Reluctant, Bookslut, Ready Steady Book, The Reading Experience, and Sarah Weinman are a few of the bloggers writing book reviews and criticism for major newspapers and magazines. The National Book Critics Circle has its own litblog called Critical Mass that posts commentary that is very critical of nonprofessional litbloggers.  Litblogger Scott Esposito also established The Quarterly Conversation, a quarterly online publication featuring lengthy literary essays.

Some litbloggers, including Laila Lalami and Mark Sarvas of The Elegant Variation, are also literary fiction authors.  Many published authors have also started blogs.  Some of these bloggers are Neil Gaiman, Alison Bechdel, and Cory Doctorow of the popular blog Boing Boing.  Writers of young adult fiction increasingly are blogging as well.  Some of these bloggers are Neil Gaiman, Holly Black, Justine Larbalestier, and Scott Westerfeld.

Group litblogs continue to diversify. A group of academics runs a litblog called The Valve. The Litblog Co-op (disbanded) was a group of 20 litbloggers who voted to collectively recommend a book every three months. In the UK, six leading litblogs joined forces to create Britlitblogs.com. There have been blogs devoted to one book, like William T. Vollmann's Rising Up and Rising Down, and blogs that have reprinted the entire contents of Samuel Pepys' Diary and Franz Kafka's diary. Today in Letters provided letters and diary entries from each day in literary history.

Making Light, John Scalzi, and Miss Snark (the latter now defunct) are written by professionals in the industry who have insights for writers. Flogging the Quill is a litblog about the craft of writing. Book Tour is a litblog creation of Virtual Book Tour founder Kevin Smokler, and Chris Anderson (author of The Long Tail. Buzz, Balls & Hype is devoted to the creation of buzz for writers.

Edward Champion from Reluctant Habits has an author interview podcast series called The Bat Segundo Show.

Kidlitosphere 
Recently children's literary bloggers have organized together and brought about an entity best known as the Kidlitosphere. These bloggers include professional reviewers, booksellers, librarians, parents, homeschoolers, authors, illustrators, and anyone else concerned in the field. Some blog professionally for the online editions of print journals, like A Fuse#8 Production on School Library Journal and ShelfTalker on Publishers Weekly. Others do a regular series of interviews and reviews, including Seven Impossible Things Before Breakfast, Big A little a, and bookshelves of doom.

The Kidlitosphere has its own literary award it hands out once a year called The Cybils Award. They also meet once a year in October for a yearly conference.

External links 
 Encyclopedia of Love is a trilingual Literary platform
 Overview of litblogs by Complete Review with extensive links
 Publishers Must Learn to Whisper on the Web Guardian Article on Litblogs and Marketing
 The rise of the literary blog Guardian Article on rise of Litblogs
Book Smart: Could cyberspace be the novel's best friend? Litblogs take off—and grow up. Village Voice Article on Litblogs and their impact on publishing
 Litblogs Provide a New Alternative for Readers Article on litblogs with links
 Litblogs.net Network of literary weblogs 
 Following Silliman's Blogroll Guide to subscribing to many popular litblogs, with links
 Litblogs.org A directory of literary blogs by country

Literary criticism
Literary magazines
Blogs
Literature websites